Margaret Heffernan (born 1955) is an entrepreneur, CEO, writer and keynote speaker. She is currently a professor of Practice at the University of Bath School of Management in the UK.

Heffernan is the former chief executive officer of five businesses and is the writer of five books that explore the areas of business and leadership. She teaches entrepreneurship, mentors executives as part of a leadership development company, and makes presentations for corporations, associations, and universities.

While Heffernan’s first two books focused on leadership and entrepreneurship and how they impact women in the workplace, her overarching theme is recognizing and releasing the talent that often lies buried inside organizations, under-valued and under-rewarded because it is unconventional.

Early life 
Heffernan was born in the US state of Texas. At some point, her family moved to the Netherlands where she lived for the majority of her childhood. Following this, Heffernan and her family moved to the United Kingdom where she later received a Master of Arts degree from Cambridge University.

Personal life 
Heffernan was awarded an Honorary Degree from the University of Bath in 2011, where she is a regular lecturer on the university's MBA program.

Currently, Heffernan lives in the outskirts of Bath, with her husband and their two children

Career 
In the United States, she worked, bought, sold and ran businesses for CMGI, serving as chief executive of iCast Corporation, ZineZone Corporation and Information Corporation. In the United Kingdom, she ran IPPA and Marlin Gas Trading Ltd. Before running her businesses, she worked for 13 years for the British Broadcasting Corporation, where she produced radio and television programs.

Her perspective as a writer is informed by her experience of running businesses that operated in highly competitive markets for creative talent. While her work has garnered respect and praise from academics, she has also received attention from leading executives who value academic insight only insofar as it is tested by real world leadership.

In 2008, Heffernan appeared in the British Channel 4’s series Secret Millionaire, in which successful entrepreneurs go undercover to identify and support community heroes. In her episode, Heffernan asked how any individual could choose which people, causes and organizations to support when so many are so needy. Ultimately, she gave money to the Bright Waters Laundry and a carnival troupe, both based in Nottingham.

TED 
In June 2012, Heffernan spoke at TEDglobal. Her talk "Dare to Disagree"  illustrated the role that debate and disconfirmation play in the development of great research teams and businesses.

In March 2013, she gave another talk for TED at TEDxDanudia, concentrating on the dangers of willful blindness.

In May 2015,  Heffernan gave a TED talk at TEDWomen 2015, titled "Why it's time to forget the Pecking Order at Work", that highlighted how social capital makes candor safe, encouraging more frequent conflicts and leading to better outcomes.

In July 2019, she gave her fourth talk for TED at TEDSummit 2019 about the need for more human skills and less technology to solve problems in business, government and life in the modern age.

Books 
Heffernan writes from her experience, saying she started writing about business because "nothing captured the reality of running companies."

The Naked Truth 

The Naked Truth: A Working Woman’s Manifesto about Business and What Really Matters was published in 2004. The book looked at the barriers to women's equality in the workplace and collected experiences and advice from successful business women who had overcome them. In particular, the book examined women’s attitudes about power and how they define and use power differently from men. The book argued that men see power as expressed through personal or organizational dominance, while women see power as derived from orchestration. Men express ambition as getting to the top, while women see ambition as the ability to live and work freely. The book concludes by arguing that what women bring to the workplace is distinctive and highly suited to the non-linear complexities of modern business.

Women On Top

How She Does It (republished in paperback as Women On Top) was published after The Naked Truth. The book examines women who substituted the struggle to succeed within traditional, male-dominated organizations for running their own companies. The book examines the statistics underlying the growth and outsize success of female-owned businesses, posing the question: "How is it that women achieve so much more when they get so much less in the way of institutional support and funding?" Examining women’s motivation, their neurological and social advantages, choice of markets, leadership styles, use of networks and advisors and their different approaches to mergers, acquisitions and exits. The book argues women’s different motivations, thinking and leading styles position them for entrepreneurial success. But much of what makes them succeed are approaches and strategies that men could also emulate. The book concludes to say women set a particularly high standard for business success that might provide a powerful antidote to some of the failed business cultures of the past.

Wilful Blindness

Wilful Blindness: Why We Ignore the Obvious at our Peril was published in 2011. In it, Heffernan argues that the biggest threats and dangers we face are the ones we don't see – not because they're secret or invisible, but because we’re willfully blind. She examines the phenomenon and traces its imprint in our private and working lives and within governments and organizations. She asks: "What makes us prefer ignorance? What are we so afraid of? Why do some people see more than others? And how can we change?"

Heffernan cites examples of willful blindness in the Catholic Church, the United States Securities and Exchange Commission, Nazi Germany, Bernard Madoff’s investors,  BP’s safety record, the military in Afghanistan and the dog-eat-dog world of subprime mortgage lenders. In its wide use of psychological research and examples from history, the book has been compared to work by Malcolm Gladwell and Nassim Nicholas Taleb.

A Bigger Prize

Her book, A Bigger Prize: Why Competition isn't Everything and How We Do Better, published in the United Kingdom on February 27, 2014, looks at the perils of competition and how this over emphasis on competing is damaging our society in everything from big business all the way down to everyday family life.

In A Bigger Prize, Heffernan examines the competition culture that is inherent in life. Instead of breeding innovation, new ideas and inspiring us to do better, competition regularly produces instead more cases of fraud, cheating, stress and inequality whilst suffocating the creative instinct we desperately need to nurture. Burn outs, scandals and poor ethics abound in the race to be the best.

So what can we do instead she asks? By speaking to scientists, musicians, athletes, entrepreneurs and executives Heffernan has found a plethora of examples of individuals and organisations who have implemented creative, cooperative ways of working together. Methods which don't set people against each other but which establish supportive environments that lead to success and happiness. "They are the real winners, sharing a bigger prize."

Beyond Measure 

In Beyond Measure, Margaret Heffernan looks back over her decades spent overseeing different organizations and comes to a counterintuitive conclusion: it's the small shifts that have the greatest impact. Heffernan argues that building the strongest organization can be accelerated by implementing seemingly small changes, such as embracing conflict as a creative catalyst; using every mind on the team; celebrating mistakes; speaking up and listening more; and encouraging time off from work. Published by Simon & Schuster, this book was commissioned by TED.

Awards
Heffernan was named one of the Internet’s Top 100 by Silicon Alley Reporter in 1999, one of the Top 25 by Streaming Media magazine and one of the Top 100 Media Executives by The Hollywood Reporter.

In 2001, her "Tear Down the Wall" campaign against AOL won the Silver SABRE award for public relations. In 2008, her documentary for BBC Radio 4 on the rise of female entrepreneurship, Changing the Rules, won the Prowess Media Award.

Her two radio plays, Enron and Power Play, were broadcast on Radio 4 and nominated for a Sony award.

In 2011, Wilful Blindness was a finalist for the Financial Times' Best Business Book award.

Publications

 A Bigger Prize. Simon & Schuster Ltd, 2014. 
 Willful Blindness. Walker & Company, 2011. 
 Women on Top. Penguin, 2008. 
 How She Does It. Viking Adult, 2007. 
 The Naked Truth. Jossey-Bass, 2004.

Articles 
Heffernan’s articles on business leadership, entrepreneurship and innovation have appeared in Fast Company, Huffington Post, BNet, Real Business, Reader’s Digest, London Business School’s Strategy Review and on Inc.com. 
 How to Be Productive: Stop Working (BNet)
 How to Write Job Descriptions that Actually Mean Something (BNet)
 Is It Okay for Women to Breastfeed at Work? (BNet)
 Dog Eat Dog (Fast Company)
 In Good Company (More Magazine)
 Recreating Milgram: the French ‘game of death’ (Huffington Post)

References

External links
 

1955 births
Living people
American women in business
American non-fiction writers
American emigrants to England
People from Texas
American emigrants to the Netherlands